Naples is an unincorporated community in Henderson County, North Carolina, United States and is part of the Asheville Metropolitan Statistical Area. It is located near U.S. Route 25 Business (US 25 Bus.) and Interstate 26 (I-26) exit 44.

History
The Naples community was named when the Naples Post Office was established in 1901, a relocation and renaming of Mud Creek Post Office since 1838. Because Mud Creek in the valley below often flooded, it reminded a local resident of the Bay of Naples.

References

External links
 Henderson County Visitors Information Center

Unincorporated communities in Henderson County, North Carolina
Unincorporated communities in North Carolina
Populated places established in 1901